Patravali, also known as Pattal, Vistaraku, Vistar or Khali, are eating plates, bowls or trencher made with broad leaves in India and Nepal. It is mainly made from sal leaves, dhak leaves and bauhinia leaves. It is also made from banyan tree leaves. It is made in circular shape, by stitching 6 to 8 leaves with tiny wooden sticks. Food is served on both fresh and dried pattal.  It is popular during traditional meals, festivals and in temples. Its manufacture is a cottage industry in India and Nepal where women work on weaving them at home in spare time.

Etymology
The word Patravali is derived from Sanskrit word Patra; a term used for both leaf and vessels or utensils. The word Patravali literally translates to "made of leaf". Patravali is also known as Pattal, Tapari, Ilai, Mantharai ilai, Chakluk, Vistaraku, Vistar, Khali, Donne, Duna, Bota in various regions of India and Nepal.

History

Plates and bowls made of leaves finds mentioned in Hindu, Jain and Buddhist texts. According to Hindu tradition food eaten on prescribed leaves is believed to have numerous health and spiritual benefits. Buddhist texts like Susiddhikara Sūtra prescribes making offering to deities on lotus leaf and dhak leaves.

Ayurvedic Samhita texts classifies leaves into Ekapatra (unifoliate, such as lotus leaf and plantain leaf), Dvipatra, Tripatra, or Saptapatra and so on according to the number of leaflets. According to Ayurvedic Samhita eating on lotus leaf is as beneficial as eating on golden plate, among prescribed leaves for making Patra include; Nelumbo, Nymphaea rubra, Nymphaea nouchali, Shorea robusta, Bauhinia variegata, Bauhinia vahlii, Bauhinia purpurea, Butea monosperma, Musa acuminata, Ficus religiosa, Ficus benghalensis, Artocarpus heterophyllus, Curcuma longa, Ficus auriculata, Erythrina stricta etc., each of these are believed to improve taste and promotes health benefits according to these texts.

Customs 
In Nepal, pattal is called Tapara/ Tapari. Nepalese Hindus extensively and compulsorily use it in religious ceremonies, feasts, marriage, birth and funeral rituals. It is also used as a popular substitute for metal or plastic plates in street food culture in Nepal and India. In India, it is a custom to serve food in a patravali on religious festivals and temple offerings like prasadam are also distributed to devotees in pattal bowls. Pattals are also used for wrapping food or steaming food.

In olden days, until a century ago, a would-be son-in-law was tested on his dexterity in making a patravali plate and bowl (for serving more liquid parts of the meal such as daal or stew) before being declared acceptable by the soon to be father-in-law.

Modern day
In India and Nepal, making pattal is a cottage industry. The leaves are stitched together with very thin pins made from bamboo, one person can make around 200 pattals a day. Mechanized pattal-making is slowly being introduced in areas like Himachal Pradesh.

The antioxidants (polyphenols) in banana leaves are reported to help fight diseases.

Pattal is one of the most eco-friendly disposable food serving systems. Many other countries such as Germany are realizing its benefits and a few companies have started making pattal commercially. In India pattals can be spotted at every general store.

See also
Butea monosperma
Banana Leaf

References

Indian culture
Objects used in Hindu worship
Serving and dining